Greece participated at the Eurovision Song Contest 1997 in Dublin, represented by Marianna Zorba with the song "Horepse" (Χόρεψε). She was selected internally by Ellinikí Radiofonía Tileórasi (ERT), the Greek broadcaster, to represent the country at the contest in Ireland.

Before Eurovision 
In order to select Greek entry for 1997 contest, on 2 December 1996, ERT announced a submission period for interested artists and composers to submit their entries. An eight-member artistic committee consisting of Dafne Bokota, Dafne Tzaferi, Yiorgos Papadakis, Lefteris Konkalidis, Aleksis Kostalas, Akis Evenis and Sasa Maneta reviewed 203 received submissions and selected the Greek entry. In February 1997, ERT announced that they had internally selected the song "An den agapisis de th’ agapithis", written by Dimosthenis Strigli to represent Greece in Dublin. After selecting the song, ERT began searching for an artist who would perform the selected song, but Dimosthenis stated that he himself would perform the selected song, however ERT still decided to search another artist who will perform the song and ultimately contacted other performers, such as Despina Vandi, Dionyssis Schinas, Fiona and Maria Polykandrioti, before ultimately deciding to replace the selected song. Ultimately, ERT selected "Horepse" performed by Marianna Zorba was selected as Greek entry for that year's contest.

At Eurovision 
Heading into the final of the contest, RTÉ reported that bookmakers ranked the entry 24th out of the 25 entries. Marianna Zorba performed 17th on the night of the contest, following Sweden and preceding Malta. At the close of voting, she had received 39 points, placing joint 12th in a field of 25. The Greek jury awarded its 12 points to Cyprus. The members of the Greek jury included Fotini Dourou, Andreas Hatziapostolou, Litsa Sakellariou, Petri Salpea, Giorgos Vrouvas, Thomas Bakalakos, Evangelos Alexandropoulos, Grigoris Lambrianidis, Loukas Anapliotis, Natalia Giakoumi, Pelagia Gialitaki, Maria Grigoriou, Katerina Kalohereti, Hrisostomos Kontakiotis, Nikolaos Lenos and Maria Sipsa.

Voting

References

1997 in Greek television
1997
Countries in the Eurovision Song Contest 1997